Andrei Tuomola (born 4 May 1989) is a Finnish swimmer. He competed in the men's 50 metre breaststroke event at the 2018 FINA World Swimming Championships (25 m), in Hangzhou, China.

References

External links
 

1989 births
Living people
Finnish male breaststroke swimmers
Place of birth missing (living people)